Chel Mangasiun-e Sofla (also Romanized as Chel Mangāsīūn-e Soflá; also known as Cheleh-ye Mangāsīūn) is a village in Sardasht Rural District, in the Central District of Lordegan County, Chaharmahal and Bakhtiari Province, Iran. At the 2006 census, its population was 55, in 9 families.

References 

Populated places in Lordegan County